DalawampunAPOsila is the third live album of the Filipino trio Apo Hiking Society released in 1989 under Universal Records.

Track listing
Heto Na (05:13)
Taglines (03:10)
Wala Nang Hahanapin Pa (03:56)
True to My Music Medley (06:22) with
Lumang Tugtugin (05:14)
Hollow Guitar Suite (08:59)
Mr. T 2 (07:37)
Ajaw-Ajaw (07:34)
Pumapatak Classic (04:56)
'Di Na Natuto (07:39)
Piece of the Peace
Finale Medley (08:00)

Related links
The Official Apo Hiking Society Website 

APO Hiking Society albums
1989 live albums